Echo Bay is an unincorporated settlement located on the west side of Gilford Island in the Broughton Archipelago on the Central Coast of British Columbia, Canada.  It is the location of the Simoom Sound post office, which used to be on the nearby Wishart Peninsula facing the sound of the same name.

See also
Echo Bay Marine Provincial Park

References

External links

Unincorporated settlements in British Columbia
Central Coast of British Columbia